Nemmara is a town in Palakkad district, Kerala, India. It is administrated by the Nemmara Grama Panchayat.  Nemmara is the entry point to the  Nelliampathi hills, which are located at the foothills of Western Ghats.

Demographics
, according to the Indian census, Nemmara had a population of 18,244 with 8,888 males and 9,356 females.

Nenmara Vallanghi Vela 
Nemmara hosts the  Nenmara Vallanghi Vela, a yearly festival jointly organised by Nemmara & Vallangi Desham.

The festival is held in the Nellikulangara Bhagavathy Temple, and runs from 3-16 April each year. It involves friendly rivalry between the villages of Nemmara and Vallangi, as they try to outcompete each other in artistic ceremonies such as Kummattikali, Karivela and a parade of caparisoned elephants.

See also 
 Vallanghi
 Nelliyampathi
 Pothundi Dam
 Vallanghy Nenmara Vela

References

External links 

Satellite image of Nemmara town
 

Villages in Palakkad district